Mohsen Hussain Al-Duhaylib (born 1 May 1994) is a Saudi Arabian weightlifter who competes in the 69 kg category. He placed sixteenth at the 2016 Summer Olympics, and also competed in the similar weight category at the 2014 and 2015 World Weightlifting Championships.

Major results

References

1994 births
Living people
Saudi Arabian male weightlifters
Place of birth missing (living people)
Weightlifters at the 2010 Summer Youth Olympics
Weightlifters at the 2014 Asian Games
Weightlifters at the 2016 Summer Olympics
Olympic weightlifters of Saudi Arabia
Weightlifters at the 2018 Asian Games
Asian Games competitors for Saudi Arabia
20th-century Saudi Arabian people
21st-century Saudi Arabian people